Borislav "Borče" Tomovski or Tomoski (Macedonian Cyrillic: Борислав Томовски, born 21 September 1972) is a Macedonian retired football player.

Club career
Tomovski started playing in lower ligue clubs FK Balkan Skopje and FK Teteks from Tetovo until he was spotted by the Serbian club FK Vojvodina where he moved in 1990 and played in the First League of FR Yugoslavia until 1995. Then he moved to Germany to FC Erzgebirge Aue where he played until 2002, with the exception of the 1997–98 season that played in Bundesliga club F.C. Hansa Rostock. After 2002, he stayed in Germany playing for Rot-Weiss Essen, SC Paderborn 07, Chemnitzer FC, and VfB Auerbach.

International career
He made his senior debut for Macedonia in a March 1994 friendly match against Slovenia and has earned a total of 2 caps, scoring no goals. His second and final international was an August 1994 friendly against Turkey.

References

External links
 
 Borislav Tomovski at FFM
 International matches in 1994 in RSSSF

1972 births
Living people
Footballers from Skopje
Association football midfielders
Yugoslav footballers
Macedonian footballers
North Macedonia international footballers
FK Teteks players
FK Vojvodina players
FC Erzgebirge Aue players
FC Hansa Rostock players
Rot-Weiss Essen players
SC Paderborn 07 players
Chemnitzer FC players
VfB Auerbach players
Yugoslav First League players
Bundesliga players
Regionalliga players
Macedonian expatriate footballers
Expatriate footballers in Serbia and Montenegro
Macedonian expatriate sportspeople in Serbia and Montenegro
Expatriate footballers in Germany
Macedonian expatriate sportspeople in Germany